Pikker may refer to:
Pikne, Estonian pagan god of lightning
Pikker (magazine), Estonian magazine of satire and humor
Augusts Pikker, Russian Empire/Estonian Olympic wrestler
Pikker, birth name of Aleksandr Samoylovich Martynov, Russian revolutionary